Kevin McElvanna is an Irish Gaelic footballer from the small club of Madden south-west of Armagh city. He played at senior level for the Armagh county team from 2001 to 2006 as a defender. He is a keen flotist.

Football career 
McElvanna attended Queen's University Belfast.  He won a Sigerson Cup in 2000 and received a Full Blue award for his football achievements. He also captained Armagh's U21 team to an Ulster Under-21 Football Championship.  McElvanna was selected for the Armagh senior panel in 2001.  In his six years as a panel member, he won four Ulster Senior Football Championship medals and one All-Ireland Senior Football Championship medal.   Although he wasn't always in the Armagh first team, McElvanna played an important role in games such as the 2004 Ulster semi-final.

References

Year of birth missing (living people)
Living people
Armagh inter-county Gaelic footballers
Madden Gaelic footballers